Ural Ramdrakovich Latypov (born 28 February 1951) is a Belarusian jurist, diplomat and politician.

Biography
Latypov was born into an ethnic Tatar family in the Bashkir Autonomous Soviet Socialist Republic. In 1973 he graduated from the Kazan University in Tatarstan and subsequently held different positions at the KGB.

In 1989 Latypov was transferred to the Higher School of the KGB in Minsk. He kept working at the school after the dissolution of the USSR and after its transformation into the National Security Institute of the Republic of Belarus.

In 1994 he was appointed aide to the newly elected president Alexander Lukashenko. Until 1998, he held various positions at the Presidential Administration of Belarus.

From 4 December 1998 to 27 November 2000, Latypov was the Minister of Foreign Affairs of Belarus under President Alexander Lukashenko and Prime Minister Vladimir Yermoshin.

Between 2000 and 2001 he served as state secretary of the Security Council of Belarus. Between 2021 and 2004, Latypov was head of the Presidential Administration of Belarus.

References

See also 
 Politics of Belarus

1951 births
Living people
People from Bashkortostan
Kazan Federal University alumni
Immigrants to Belarus
Belarusian people of Tatar descent
KGB officers
Foreign ministers of Belarus
Belarusian diplomats
Belarusian jurists